Oshivelo is a settlement in northern Namibia.

Transport and infrastructure 

Oshivelo has a clinic that in 2014 was refurbished and named after Catherine Bullen, a woman that died here in 2002 due to inadequate facilities.

In early 2005, the new Northern Railway reached Oshivelo with a  section from Tsumeb. By mid-2006, it had reached Ondangwa, and. A train service known as the Omugulugwombashe Star traveled weekly on this track until the locomotives broke down after a few rounds of service.

See also 

 Railway stations in Namibia

References

External links 
 Maplandia Map

Populated places in the Oshikoto Region